South Dakota Department of Transportation Bridge No. 02-007-220, or Platte Creek Bridge, is a former historic place near White Lake, South Dakota. Replaced in 2004, a local road followed the bridge over Platte Creek. Designed in the Warren Pony Truss style by the Canton Bridge Company, the structure was maintained by the South Dakota Department of Transportation.

The bridge was constructed in 1908 and added to the National Register in 1999. It was removed from the register in 2008.

References

Former National Register of Historic Places in South Dakota
Road bridges in South Dakota
Bridges completed in 1908
Buildings and structures in Aurora County, South Dakota
1908 establishments in South Dakota
Warren truss bridges in the United States
Pony truss bridges